Europium acetylacetonate is a compound with formula Eu(C5H7O2)3(H2O)2. It is a europium(III) complex with three acetylacetonate and two aquo ligands. The electronic structure of the  core gives the complex an unusual charge-transfer band absent in other lanthanide acetylacetonates. The photoluminescent emission lines occur near 465 (blue), 525 (green), and 579 nm (yellow), and are unusually sharp, especially the yellow doublet. Doping a blend of polyacrylate and polycarbonate with europium acetylacetonate enhances photoluminescence over a broad range of ultraviolet wavelengths. EuFOD is a substituted derivative.

References

Europium(III) compounds
Acetylacetonate complexes